Owen George Thompson (born 17 March 1978) is a Scottish National Party politician currently serving as the Member of Parliament (MP) for Midlothian. He was elected in 2015, defeated at the 2017 general election, and regained the seat at the 2019 general election.

Early life
Thompson is the son of the late Robert Thompson and Margaret Thompson. He was brought up in Loanhead after moving there when he was seven. He studied accounting and finance at Edinburgh Napier University.

Political career
Thompson had previously been the leader of Midlothian Council. He was first elected to the council at the Loanhead by-election in 2005. At the age of 27, he was Scotland's youngest councillor at the time. He was then re-elected in the 2007 council election and again in the 2012 council election. He became deputy leader of the council in 2012, and leader in November 2013, succeeding his party colleague Bob Constable. He remained on the council until 2015.

In December 2014, the Bonnyrigg, Loanhead and District SNP branch nominated Thompson to be the party's official candidate at the 2015 general election. He was elected as the MP for Midlothian with 24,453 votes, a 50.6% share of the votes cast. He was sworn into office at Westminster on 20 May 2015, and on the same day was given a position in the SNP Whips' Office under the SNP's chief whip, Mike Weir.

Thompson narrowly lost his seat at the 2017 general election to Danielle Rowley of the Labour Party by 885 votes, receiving 34.4% of the overall vote share, compared to 36.4% for Rowley. However, two years later, at the 2019 election, he regained the seat, taking a 41.5% vote share and a majority of 5,705 (11.8%).

In March 2021, Thompson was appointed chief whip for the SNP in Westminster after the resignation of Patrick Grady. He was sacked by new leader Stephen Flynn in December 2022.

Personal life 
Thompson lists his recreations as football and computer games.

References

External links
 Profile on SNP website
 Personal website

1978 births
Alumni of Edinburgh Napier University
Living people
Members of the Parliament of the United Kingdom for Scottish constituencies
People from Loanhead
Scottish National Party councillors
Scottish National Party MPs
UK MPs 2015–2017
UK MPs 2019–present